Dummy was a nickname commonly applied to "deaf and dumb" (deaf-mute) athletes, especially baseball players, in the late 19th and early 20th century. In that era, the word "dumb" was used to describe someone who could not speak, rather than someone who was stupid; but since the ability to speak was often connected to one's intelligence, the epithets "dumb" and "dummy" became interchangeable with stupidity. Notable persons with the nickname include:

 Dummy Deegan (1874–1957), American baseball pitcher
 Ed Dundon (1859–1893), American baseball pitcher credited with being the first deaf player in major league history
 Dummy Hoy (1862–1961), American baseball center fielder
 Dummy Lebey (1896–1959), American college football player
 Dummy Leitner (1871–1960), American baseball pitcher
 Herbert Murphy (1886–1962), American baseball shortstop
 Dummy Stephenson (1869–1924), American baseball outfielder
 Dummy Taylor (1875–1958), American baseball pitcher

See also 
 Dummy, the Witch of Sible Hedingham (c. 1788–1863), pseudonym of an elderly deaf-mute man who was one of the last people to be accused of witchcraft in England

Lists of people by nickname